This is a list of known mass shootings that have occurred in the Soviet Union.

List of mass shootings in the Soviet Union

See also 
List of mass shootings in Russia
Shooting of fellow soldiers

Notes

References 

Crime in the Soviet Union
Mass shootings in the Soviet Union
Soviet Union
Soviet Union crime-related lists